The 1909–10 Auburn Tigers men's basketball team represented Auburn University during the 1909–10 Intercollegiate Athletic Association of the United States college basketball season. The head coach was Mike Donahue, coaching his fifth season with the Tigers.

Schedule

|-

References

Auburn Tigers men's basketball seasons
Auburn
Auburn Tigers
Auburn Tigers